Bertrand N'Dzomo (born 18 June 1985) is a French footballer currently playing for FC Forward Morges.

References

External links

1985 births
Living people
People from Domont
French footballers
French expatriate footballers
Le Mans FC players
Yverdon-Sport FC players
FC Lausanne-Sport players
FC Stade Nyonnais players
FC Schaffhausen players
FC Fribourg players
FC Le Mont players
FC La Chaux-de-Fonds players
Ligue 2 players
Swiss Challenge League players
Swiss Promotion League players
Association football midfielders
Footballers from Val-d'Oise
French expatriate sportspeople in Switzerland
Expatriate footballers in Switzerland